The Visual Effects Society Award for Outstanding Created Environment in an Episode, Commercial, or Real-Time Project is one of the annual awards given by the Visual Effects Society starting from 2004. The award was originally titled "Outstanding Created Environment in a Live Action Broadcast Program", and changed in 2005 to "Outstanding Created Environment in a Live Action Broadcast Program, Commercial, or Music Video". It was again changed in 2009, this time to "Outstanding Created Environment in a Feature Motion Picture", and again in 2011 to "Outstanding Created Environment in a Live Action Feature Motion Picture". Before its final change in 2015, to its current title, it was re-titled in 2014 to "Outstanding Created Environment in a Photoreal/Live Action Feature Motion Picture".

Winners and nominees

2000s
Outstanding Created Environment in a Live Action Broadcast Program

Outstanding Created Environment in a Live Action Broadcast Program, Commercial, or Music Video

Outstanding Created Environment in a Broadcast Program or Commercial

2010s
Outstanding Created Environment in a Live Action Broadcast Program

Outstanding Created Environment in a Broadcast Program or Commercial

Outstanding Created Environment in a Commercial, Broadcast Program, or Video Game

Outstanding Created Environment in an Episode, Commercial, or Real-Time Project

2020s

References

E
Awards established in 2004